Briggs Lake is a lake in Sherburne County, in the U.S. state of Minnesota.

Briggs Lake was named for Josiah Briggs, a pioneer who settled near the lake.

See also
List of lakes in Minnesota

References

Lakes of Minnesota
Lakes of Sherburne County, Minnesota